Pampa Hermosa District is one of eight districts of the province Satipo in Peru.

References

1965 establishments in Peru
States and territories established in 1965